Lanette is a feminine given name and variant of Lana. Notable people with the name include:

Lanette Phillips,  American film and music video producer
Lanette Scheeline (1910–2001), American artist

See also
 Lanotte
 Lynette and Lyonesse

Feminine given names